Jeremy Hugh Beecham, Baron Beecham  (born 14 November 1944) is a British Labour politician and a senior figure in English local government. He was leader of Newcastle City Council and the first Chairman of the
Local Government Association. He was the elected Chairman of the National Executive Committee of the Labour Party (October 2005 – September 2006).

Beecham was educated at the Royal Grammar School, Newcastle upon Tyne, and University College, Oxford (1962–1965), where he obtained a first class honours degree in law. He became a solicitor. He joined the Labour Party in 1959, and was elected a councillor for Benwell, Newcastle, in the Newcastle City Council elections of 11 May 1967. 

He stood for Parliament without success in Tynemouth in 1970. He chaired the Social Services Committee on the council from 1973 to 1977 and was Leader of Newcastle from 1977 to 1994, chairing the Finance Committee from 1979 to 1984.

In 1991, Beecham became Chairman of the Association of Metropolitan Authorities (AMA). When the AMA merged with the Association of District Councils and the Association of County Councils on 1 April 1997 to form the Local Government Association, he became the first chairman of the LGA. He is, the LGA vice-chairman and continues to chair the LGA Labour Group.He was the President of the British Urban Regeneration Association (now folded). 

Beecham belongs to Labour Friends of Israel.

Beecham has been a member of many boards and committees in Newcastle and North East England, and advising government.
He has been a member of the Labour Party National Executive Committee since 1998 and was its chairman.
He became a Knight Bachelor in the 1994 Birthday Honours having the honour conferred by HM The Queen on 22 November 1994. 

He was made a Freeman of the City of Newcastle in 1995. He is Deputy Lieutenant for the County of Tyne and Wear and continues to represent Benwell and Scotswood on the City Council.  He has been a council member at charity Common Purpose since 1989. He is Jewish, and a board member of the New Israel Fund in the UK.

On 20 July 2010, Beecham was created a life peer as Baron Beecham, of Benwell and Newcastle upon Tyne in the County of Tyne and Wear, and was introduced in the House of Lords on 28 July 2010. He sat on the Labour benches until his retirement in 2021.

References

1944 births
Living people
Labour Party (UK) councillors
Labour Party (UK) life peers
Life peers created by Elizabeth II
Councillors in Newcastle upon Tyne
Politicians from Newcastle upon Tyne
People educated at the Royal Grammar School, Newcastle upon Tyne
Alumni of University College, Oxford
Deputy Lieutenants of Tyne and Wear
Labour Friends of Israel
Knights Bachelor
Politicians awarded knighthoods
Chairs of the Labour Party (UK)
Jewish British politicians
Leaders of local authorities of England
Chairs of the Local Government Association